Gangotri Kujur is an Indian politician and member of the Bharatiya Janata Party. From 2014 to 2019, Kujur was a member of the Jharkhand Legislative Assembly from the Mandar constituency in Ranchi district.

References 

Year of birth missing (living people)
Living people
People from Ranchi district
Bharatiya Janata Party politicians from Jharkhand
Jharkhand MLAs 2014–2019